South Regina was a territorial electoral district in the Northwest Territories, Canada that came into existence with the passage of the North-West Representation Act of 1888 and was succeeded by a riding of the same name when Alberta and Saskatchewan were created in 1905.

Members of the Legislative Assembly (MLAs)

Election results

1888 election

1891 election

1894 election

1898 election

1902 election

See also
 Regina South, created 1964

References

External links 
Website of the Legislative Assembly of Northwest Territories

Former electoral districts of Northwest Territories